The Herb Brooks Arena is a multi-purpose arena in Lake Placid, New York. This surface, along with the USA Rink, was built for the 1980 Winter Olympics.

About
The arena hosted various events during the 1980 Winter Olympics, most famously the ice hockey tournament that saw the United States' 4–3 victory over the Soviet Union, the game commonly referred to as the Miracle on Ice. In 2005, to commemorate the 25th anniversary of the American victory, the arena was named after the late Herb Brooks, who coached the American team during the 1980 Olympics. Other events the arena hosted during the 1980 games include  figure skating events and the closing ceremony.

The arena has been used several times for college hockey championships in the United States. It hosted the 1984 and 1988 men's NCAA Men's Ice Hockey Championship, commonly referred to as the Frozen Four. The arena has hosted the NCAA Women's Ice Hockey Championship as well, in 2007. From 1993 to 2002, the arena annually hosted the ECAC Hockey League's championships every March. The ECAC announced in July 2012 that the league would again crown its champion in Herb Brooks Arena for the 2013–14, 2014–15, and 2015–16 seasons. In March 2016 the contract was extended for another three years through the 2019 ECAC tournament.

The Glens Falls-based Adirondack Thunder ice hockey team have used the arena for a few games because of high school basketball championship games being held at the Glens Falls Civic Center.

Over a two-week period in late January through early February 2021, the National Women's Hockey League held its 2020–21 season at the arena in an isolation bubble due to the COVID-19 pandemic.

See also

 Herb Brooks National Hockey Center

References 

1980 Winter Olympics official report. Volume 1. pp. 47–59.

External links 

 , hosted by the New York State Olympic Regional Development Authority

Venues of the 1932 Winter Olympics
Venues of the 1980 Winter Olympics
Indoor ice hockey venues in New York (state)
College ice hockey venues in the United States
Olympic figure skating venues
Olympic ice hockey venues
Sports venues in Essex County, New York
Sports venues completed in 1931
1931 establishments in New York (state)